Centrio Mall is an integrated mixed-use complex composed of a shopping mall, a hotel, a BPO/office building and a condominium tower located along Capt. Vicente Roa St. and Corrales Ave., cor. Claro M. Recto Avenue, Cagayan de Oro, Philippines. 

Following the concept of "shop, dine, live, work, and play", Centrio Mall occupies 3.7 hectares in the city's central business district. It is also across the road from Gaisano City Mall and one block away from SM CDO Downtown Premier, as well as Limketkai Mall. 

Centrio Mall is owned by the Ayala Corporation and has an estimated cost of ₱5 billion.

Centrio Mall

During the construction period, Ayala executives decided to preserve two old acacia trees, which are believed to be 60 years old. The mall's alfresco area was built around the two large trees, which became the foundation of its mini-park called Centrio Mall Garden. The indoor park has become the premier attraction and at the same time a children's playground, making the mall the first eco-friendly and child-friendly shopping destination in the city. 

The mall's major anchor stores are Rustan's Fresh, and a two-level Robinsons Department Store. The mall is also the location of the Department of Foreign Affairs Consular Office Cagayan de Oro, a passport office serving the Northern Mindanao region which opened at the third level in June 2014.

Home of more than 300 tenants composed of local, national and international brands of stores, boutiques, clinics, service centers and restaurants, the mall opened on November 9, 2012. It has four modern cinemas offering 2D and 3D technologies to movie-goers. 

Today, Centrio Mall since its opening is fast becoming a favorite venue, mostly of local trade fairs, fashion shows, exhibitions, concerts and other events being held either in activity center, which can accommodate more than 300 people, or in the garden.

Centrio Tower
Centrio Tower is a 23-storey condominium tower. It is owned and developed by the Cagayan De Oro Gateway Corp., a joint venture between Ayala Land Inc. and the Antonio Floirendo Group of Companies of Davao. The tower will house 21 floors of residential units above two parking levels. Two commercial units will be located at the ground floor. The tower will also have an adult and kiddie swimming pools, a multi-purpose hall, outdoor exercise and play equipment, as well as open areas as its amenities.

Incidents 
On Sunday, May 14, 2017, a fire took place at Gerry's Grill on Centrio Mall's second floor. It which was reported at 8:27 pm and was contained by 9:00 pm. According to the initial investigation, the fire started in the restaurant's kitchen and may have been caused by dust particles in the chimney that combined with the hot temperature from the grilling machine.

See also
 Ayala Malls

References

External links
Centrio Mall Official website
Official website
Ayala Malls
DDT Konstract, Inc.
Centrio Mall

Shopping malls in Cagayan de Oro
Mixed-use developments in the Philippines
Shopping malls established in 2012
Buildings and structures in Cagayan de Oro
Ayala Malls
2012 establishments in the Philippines